Pachydellus is a genus of mites in the family Pachylaelapidae. There are about 16 described species in Pachydellus.

Species
These 16 species belong to the genus Pachydellus:

 Pachydellus alojzi Mašán, 2007
 Pachydellus angulatipes (Berlese, 1903)
 Pachydellus badongensis (Liu & Ma, 2003)
 Pachydellus decorus Mašán, 2007
 Pachydellus furcifer (Oudemans, 1902)
 Pachydellus hades (Halliday, 2001)
 Pachydellus ineptus (Hirschmann & Krauss, 1965)
 Pachydellus ivanovi (Koroleva, 1977)
 Pachydellus katarinae Mašán, 2007
 Pachydellus latior (Berlese, 1920)
 Pachydellus problematicus Mašán, 2007
 Pachydellus sculptus (Berlese, 1920)
 Pachydellus sinuatus (Willmann, 1939)
 Pachydellus tablasoti (Schweizer, 1961)
 Pachydellus tereziae Mašán, 2007
 Pachydellus vexillifer (Willmann, 1956)

References

Acari